Kama Darreh (also Romanized as Kamā Darreh and Komā Darreh; also known as Kūmeh Darreh) is a village in Howli Rural District, in the Central District of Paveh County, Kermanshah Province, Iran. At the 2006 census, its population was 95, in 23 families.

References 

Populated places in Paveh County